Feed 'em and Weep is a 1938 Our Gang short comedy film directed by Gordon Douglas.  It was the 166th Our Gang short (167th episode, 78th talking short, and 79th talking episode) that was released.

Plot
It is Mr. Hood's birthday, and he has been eagerly anticipating a quiet dinner at home with his family, his lunch consisted only of "a lettuce sandwich on gluten bread." Darla then mentions that she has invited her friends to the celebration: Alfalfa, Porky, and Philip. The well-meaning trio drive Mr. Hood to distraction with loud and interminable choruses of "Happy Birthday, Mr. Hood." Then they present their ill-conceived presents: a frog, a duck, and a cat. When the kids are not arguing over their favorite comic-strip characters, they are busily devouring Mr. Hood's birthday dinner. Mr. Hood, disgusted over the whole affair, declares he is going out to get a bite to eat and leaves.

Notes
Regular Our Gang member Billie "Buckwheat" Thomas does not appear in Feed 'em and Weep due to a short illness. In for Buckwheat is Philip Hurlic, a prominent African-American child actor of the time. Hurlic has bit and background parts in several other Our Gang shorts and featured roles in films such as The Adventures of Tom Sawyer (1938) and Hal Roach's own Zenobia (1939).

Feed 'em and Weep is also the first of five Our Gang shorts produced without one of the series' stars, George "Spanky" McFarland. McFarland had actually exited Our Gang following the previous entry, Came the Brawn, but would return to the series after its transition to MGM later in 1938.

Cast

The Gang
 Darla Hood as Darla Hood
 Eugene Lee as Porky
 Carl Switzer as Alfalfa
 Philip Hurlic as Philip
 Gary Jasgur as Junior
 Leonard Landy as Percy

Additional cast
 Johnny Arthur as Johnny Hood
 Wilma Cox as Mrs. Hood

See also
 Our Gang filmography

References

External links

1938 films
1938 comedy films
American black-and-white films
Films directed by Gordon Douglas
Hal Roach Studios short films
Our Gang films
1930s American films